Dynamite Dan II: Dr Blitzen and the Islands of Arcanum is a platform game and the sequel to 1985's Dynamite Dan. It was written for the ZX Spectrum by Rod Bowkett and published by Mirrorsoft. An Amstrad CPC port was released the same year.

Reception
CRASH gave a 93% review Readers chose it as the best platform game of the year.

Your Sinclair rated it 9 out of 10. Reviewers were impressed with the graphical and sound effect improvements over the original game, and the fun gameplay.

References

External links

1986 video games
Amstrad CPC games
Mirrorsoft games
Platform games
Single-player video games
Video game sequels
Video games developed in the United Kingdom
ZX Spectrum games